Landover Hills is a town in Prince George's County, Maryland, United States. Per the 2020 census, the population was 1,815. The town has a neighborhood named Defense Heights.

History
Landover Hills was incorporated in 1945.

Geography
Landover Hills is located at 38°56'36" North, s76°53'27" West (38.943244, -76.890811).

Adjacent areas
 Woodlawn (northwest)
 Landover (south)
 East Riverdale (northeast)
 New Carrollton (northeast)
 Bladensburg (west)
 District of Columbia (west)

Demographics

2020 census

Note: the US Census treats Hispanic/Latino as an ethnic category. This table excludes Latinos from the racial categories and assigns them to a separate category. Hispanics/Latinos can be of any race.

2010 census
As of the census of 2010, there were 1,687 people, 496 households, and 381 families residing in the town. The racial makeup of the town was 22.1% White, 43.3% African American, 1.4% Native American, 1.4% Asian, 27.4% from other races, and 4.4% from two or more races. Hispanic or Latino of any race were 40.8% of the population.

There were 496 households, of which 48.0% had children under the age of 18 living with them, 49.4% were married couples living together, 21.2% had a female householder with no husband present, 6.3% had a male householder with no wife present, and 23.2% were non-families. 19.4% of all households were made up of individuals, and 5.2% had someone living alone who was 65 years of age or older. The average household size was 3.40 and the average family size was 3.78.

The median age in the town was 31.3 years. 29.2% of residents were under the age of 18; 10% were between the ages of 18 and 24; 31.9% were from 25 to 44; 23.4% were from 45 to 64; and 5.5% were 65 years of age or older. The gender makeup of the town was 50.1% male and 49.9% female.

2000 Census
At the 2000 census, the median income for a household in the town was $55,313, and the median income for a family was $55,938. Males had a median income of $31,842 versus $32,464 for females. The per capita income for the town was $18,779. About 10.1% of families and 11.0% of the population were below the poverty line, including 16.7% of those under age 18 and 6.2% of those age 65 or over.

The town's fire department is a combination career/volunteer fire department and operates an engine company, a BLS ambulance, an ALS medic unit, and a medical ambulance bus.

Government
Mayor: Jeffrey Schomisch
City Council:
Jeannette M. Ripley - Ward 1 (also serves as Vice Mayor)
Joseph Williams - Ward 1
Kathleen Walker - Ward 2
Vacant - Ward 2
Todd Over - Ward 3
 Vacant - Ward 3

Immediate Past Mayor: Lee P. Walker

Town Manager: Rommel Pazmino

Public Works Director: James Schad

Chief of Police: Robert V. Liberati Jr.

Website: https://www.landoverhillsmd.gov/

The U.S. Postal Service operates the Landover Hills Post Office adjacent to the town, in an unincorporated area with a Hyattsville postal address.

Transportation

The largest highway serving Landover Hills is U.S. Route 50, which skims the southeast edge of town. There is no direct access between US 50 and the surface streets of Landover Hills, with the nearest interchange being just outside the town limits at Maryland Route 410. MD 410 connects to Maryland Route 450, which serves as the main surface highway providing direct access to Landover Hills.

Education
Landover Hills falls under the jurisdiction of Prince George's County Public Schools. Its territory is zoned to multiple schools:

Elementary schools:
Cooper Lane Elementary School (Pre K-6)
Judge Sylvania S. Woods Elementary School (Pre K-6)

The zoned middle school is Charles Carroll Middle School (7-8). Parkdale High School (9-12) serves Landover Hills.

Private schools in the Landover Hills area are:
New Hope Academy (3yrs-12th grade) - in the town limits
Saint Mary's School (Catholic; preschool-8th grade) - in the town limits
Ascension Lutheran School (K-8th grade) - Adjacent to the town.

Infrastructure

Law enforcement
The Landover Hills Police Department (LHPD) is the primary law enforcement agency servicing the municipality. The LHPD is assisted by the Prince George's County Police and Sheriff's Office as directed by authority. The current chief of police is Chief Robert V. Liberati, Jr. The agency also doubles as the town code enforcement when needed.

References

External links

https://www.landoverhillsmd.gov/

Towns in Maryland
Towns in Prince George's County, Maryland
Washington metropolitan area